Lynn Nolan Ryan Jr. (born January 31, 1947), nicknamed "the Ryan Express", is an American former professional baseball pitcher and sports executive. Over a record 27-year playing career in Major League Baseball (MLB) spanning four decades, Ryan pitched for the New York Mets, California Angels, Houston Astros, and Texas Rangers. After his retirement in 1993, Ryan served as chief executive officer (CEO) of the Texas Rangers and an executive advisor to the Houston Astros. He was inducted into the Baseball Hall of Fame in 1999, and is widely considered to be one of the greatest MLB pitchers of all time. Ryan was a right-handed pitcher who consistently threw pitches that were clocked above 100 miles per hour (161 km/h). He maintained this velocity throughout his pitching career. Ryan was also known to throw a devastating 12–6 curveball at exceptional velocity for a breaking ball.

Ryan had a lifetime win–loss record of 324–292 (.526) and was an eight-time All-Star. He has 5,714 career strikeouts, an MLB record that is 839 more than runner-up Randy Johnson. Similarly, Ryan's 2,795 bases on balls lead second-place Steve Carlton by 962 – walking over 50% more hitters than any other pitcher in MLB history. Ryan's lifetime batting average against of .204 is also a major league record. Ryan, Pedro Martínez, Randy Johnson, Trevor Hoffman, and Sandy Koufax are the only five pitchers inducted into the Baseball Hall of Fame who had more strikeouts than innings pitched. Ryan is one of only three players in history to have his number retired by at least three teams, along with Jackie Robinson (whose number was retired by Major League Baseball) and Frank Robinson.

Ryan is the all-time leader in no-hitters with seven, three more than any other pitcher. He is tied with Bob Feller for the most one-hitters, with 12. Ryan also pitched 18 two-hitters. Despite this, he never pitched a perfect game, nor did he ever win a Cy Young Award; both were largely attributed to his high walk rate. Ryan is one of only 29 players in baseball history to have appeared in MLB games in four different decades.

Early life

Nolan Ryan was born on January 31, 1947, in Refugio, Texas, a small town located just south of Victoria in the southern part of the state. Ryan was the youngest of six children born to Martha Lee (née Hancock; 1913–1990) and Lynn Nolan Ryan Sr. (1907–1970). The senior Ryan operated a newspaper delivery service for the Houston Post that required him to rise in the early morning hours to prepare 1,500 newspapers for delivery over a 55-mile route. The children were expected to help with the daily tasks. Ryan's family lived in nearby Woodsboro, Texas in Refugio County, until they moved to Alvin, Texas in Brazoria County, when Nolan was six weeks old. As a young boy, Nolan enjoyed throwing objects at any target. His father thought baseball a better usage for his arm; therefore, he encouraged Nolan to play the game.

Ryan joined Alvin Little League Baseball when he was nine, made the all-star team when he was 11 and 12, and pitched the first no-hitter of his life a few years later. Ryan also played various positions besides pitcher. In junior high school, Ryan could throw a softball over 100 yards. After ninth grade, Ryan quit playing football after a tackle and fumble caused by future NFL running back Norm Bulaich made him decide to focus on baseball.

Ryan played baseball for Coach Jim Watson at Alvin High School for all of his high school career. Ryan held the school's single game strikeout record for 44 years, striking out 21 hitters in a 7-inning game. The record was eventually tied by Alvin High School pitchers Aaron Stewart and Josh Land in the same week in 2009. In 1963, at an Alvin High School game at Clear Creek High School in League City, Texas, Red Murff, a scout for the New York Mets, first noticed sophomore pitcher Ryan. Coach Watson recounted to Murff that some opponents refused to bat against Ryan and how his hard pitches would sometimes break bones in his catchers' hands. In his subsequent report to the Mets, Murff stated that Ryan had "the best arm I've seen in my life." The Mets later drafted Ryan. As a senior in 1965, Ryan had a 19–3 record and led the Alvin Yellow Jackets to the Texas high school state finals. Ryan pitched in 27 games, with 20 starts. He had 12 complete games, with 211 strikeouts and 61 walks.

Professional career

Draft and minor leagues
In 1965, after graduating from Alvin, Ryan was drafted by the New York Mets in the 12th round of the 1965 Major League Baseball draft, with the 295th overall pick. Ryan signed with the Mets and immediately pitched for the Marion Mets in the Appalachian League and for the Mets team in the Florida Instructional League. Overall, he was 6–9 in 1965 with a 4.33 ERA and 150 strikeouts in 120 innings. In 1966, Ryan pitched for the Class A Greenville Mets of the Western Carolinas League, where he went 17–2 with a 2.51 ERA and 272 strikeouts in 183 innings. He was then promoted to the Class AA Williamsport Mets of the Eastern League, where he was 0–2 with a 0.95 ERA, striking out 35 batters in 19 innings. Overall, Ryan had 307 strikeouts in 202 minor league innings in 1966, earning a late-season call-up to the New York Mets. In 1967, Ryan pitched three games in relief for the Class AAA Jacksonville Suns, started one game for the Class A Winter Haven Mets and pitched eight games for the Mets team in the Florida Instructional League. In 34 total innings, Ryan had 54 strikeouts in 1967.

New York Mets (1966, 1968–1971)
When Ryan was called up by the New York Mets in 1966, he was the second-youngest player in the league. Playing in only two games, his first strikeout was Pat Jarvis, and he gave up his first major league home run to Joe Torre.

Ryan missed much of the 1967 season due to illness, an arm injury, and service with the Army Reserve; he pitched only seven innings for the Mets' minor league affiliate in Jacksonville. In the 1968 season, Ryan returned to the major leagues, where he stayed until his retirement in 1993. Ryan was unable to crack the Mets' pitching rotation, led by Tom Seaver and Jerry Koosman. Ryan was used more as a reliever and spot starter by the 1969 Mets. To deal with frequent blisters on his throwing hand he often soaked his fingers in pickle brine, although the technique's effectiveness was questioned by Ryan's teammates and coaches.

Ryan pitched well for the Mets in the 1969 postseason. Against the Atlanta Braves in the NLCS, Ryan completed a Mets sweep by throwing seven innings of relief in Game 3, getting his first playoff win (it took him 12 years to get another). Then in the 1969 World Series, Ryan saved Game 3, pitching  shutout innings against the Baltimore Orioles. The Game 3 victory gave the Mets a 2–1 lead in the Series, which they went on to win in five games. It was Ryan's only World Series appearance in his career.

On April 18, 1970, Ryan tied a Mets record by striking out 15 batters in one game. Four days later, Ryan's teammate Seaver topped it with a then-MLB record 19 against the San Diego Padres (though Ryan tied this record four years later). Ryan has credited his time with Seaver and the Mets with turning him from just a flamethrower into a pitcher.

Ryan's performance declined sharply in the second half of his final season with the Mets. His earned run average for the first half of the 1971 season was 2.24; in the second half, it was 7.74. , this was the steepest second half increase in ERA for a starting pitcher in MLB history.

Ryan did not want to be traded from the Mets, and when it happened he felt betrayed by the team that drafted him. His views on this calmed only once he started running the Rangers and gained a better understanding of the business side of baseball.

In five seasons with the Mets, 105 games and 74 starts, Ryan had a 29–38 record, with a 3.58 ERA, 1.39 WHIP, with 344 walks and 493 strikeouts in 511 innings.

California Angels (1972–1979)

On December 10, 1971, the 25-year-old Ryan was traded to the California Angels along with pitcher Don Rose, catcher Francisco Estrada, and outfielder Leroy Stanton for shortstop Jim Fregosi (who later managed Ryan in Anaheim). The deal has been cited as one of the worst in Mets history but was not viewed as unreasonable at the time given Ryan's relatively unremarkable numbers as a Met and Fregosi's good career to that point.

In his first season with the Angels, Ryan was given a chance to pitch regularly as a starter for the first time in his career, mainly because by then he had fulfilled his military obligation and no longer had to commute to Houston every other week. He had a league-leading 329 strikeouts—nearly a third more than the AL runner-up, and to that point, the fourth-highest total of the 20th century. Within five seasons, the season was only Ryan's fourth-highest strikeout total. He also set a still-standing Major League record by allowing only 5.26 hits per nine innings, breaking Luis Tiant's 5.30 in 1968, as well as posting a 2.28 earned run average that year, to date the second-lowest in franchise history, trailing only Dean Chance's 1.65 in 1964. Though Ryan's actual winning percentage hovered only slightly over .500, his strikeouts and no-hitters brought him media attention. Meanwhile, Fregosi failed to produce as a Met, making no significant contribution to the Mets' 1973 pennant-winning campaign; he was sold to the Texas Rangers mid-season.

Although the Angels were a sub-.500 team and remained one for much of his time there, Ryan managed to post some winning records, notably 19–16 in 1972, 21–16 in 1973 and 22–16 in 1974 (the 22 wins tied what remains the Angels franchise record, set by Clyde Wright in 1970). He finished 2nd in the Cy Young balloting (losing to Jim Palmer 88–62) in 1973. It was the closest he ever came in the Cy Young balloting. Ryan also led the league in losses in 1976 with a 17–18 record (one short of the franchise record for losses). In the early 1970s, many teams used a four-man rotation and expected the starter to complete the game; thus most games Ryan started ended in a decision.

On July 9, 1972, Ryan struck out three batters on nine pitches in the second inning of a 3–0 win over the Boston Red Sox; he became the seventh American League pitcher to accomplish the immaculate inning, and the first pitcher in Major League history to accomplish the feat in both leagues. (On April 19, 1968, he had struck out three batters on nine pitches in the second inning of a 2–1 win over the St. Louis Cardinals, becoming the eighth National League pitcher and the 14th pitcher in Major League history to accomplish the feat.)

In 1973, Ryan set his first major record when he struck out 383 batters in one season, beating Sandy Koufax's old mark by one. Remarking on this feat, Koufax joked, "Yeah, and he also surpassed my total for bases on balls in a single season by 91. I suspect half of those guys he struck out swung rather than get hit." Ryan threw two no-hitters in 1973. In the second one, on July 15 against the Detroit Tigers, he struck out 17 batters – the most in a recorded no-hitter. (This record was later tied by Max Scherzer on October 3, 2015.) Ryan was so dominant in this game, it led to one of baseball's best-remembered pranks. Tigers first baseman and cleanup hitter Norm Cash came to the plate with two outs in the bottom of the ninth, having already struck out twice, and was carrying a clubhouse table leg instead of a bat. Plate umpire Ron Luciano ordered Cash to go back and get a regulation bat, to which Cash replied, "Why? I won't hit him anyway!" With a regulation bat in hand, Cash did finally make contact, but popped out to end the game. Cash's teammate Mickey Stanley commented on facing Ryan that day by saying, "Those were the best pitches I ever heard."

Pitching 13 innings against the Boston Red Sox on June 14, 1974, Ryan threw 235 pitches, striking out 19, walking 10 and getting a no-decision.

During a September 7, 1974 game against the Chicago White Sox at Anaheim Stadium, Ryan became the first Major League pitcher to have his pitch speed measured during a game.

Ryan added a third no-hitter in 1974 and a fourth in 1975, tying another of Koufax's records. In 1974 he twice struck out 19 batters, tying Tom Seaver and Steve Carlton for the single-game record for a nine-inning game. Roger Clemens became the first pitcher with a 20-strikeout game in 1986.

The California Angels finally made the playoffs in Ryan's eighth and final year there in 1979. He started Game 1 of the ALCS and threw seven innings against the Orioles' Jim Palmer, but neither man was involved in the decision as Baltimore won in the 10th inning. Ryan was scheduled to pitch Game 5, but the Angels were eliminated in four. The season complete, Ryan became a free agent.

Ryan led the American League in strikeouts seven times during his eight seasons with the Angels, but he also led the league in walks in six of those years, and finished second the other two seasons: 1975 and 1979. Aside from Bob Feller in 1938, Ryan is the only man since 1900 to walk 200 batters in a season, which he did twice: in 1974 and 1977. Emblematic of this, his 1974 no-hitter against the Minnesota Twins included eight walks.

Though Ryan's strikeouts and no-hitters got him considerable media attention, he did not win over Angels general manager Buzzie Bavasi, who dismissed him as a flashy .500 pitcher (Ryan was 26–27 in the last two years he was with the Angels).

In his eight seasons with the Angels, Ryan was 138–121, a 3.07 ERA, 1.29 WHIP, with 1,302 walks and 2,416 strikeouts in 2181 innings over 288 starts and 156 complete games.

Houston Astros (1980–1988)

On November 19, 1979, Nolan Ryan became the first million-dollar player when he signed a four-year free-agent contract with the Houston Astros for $4.5 million (equivalent to $ million in ). The salary quadrupled what he had been making with the California Angels. The normally light-hitting Ryan got his Houston years started with a bang in a nationally televised game against the Los Angeles Dodgers on April 12, 1980, when he hit a three-run home run off Don Sutton. It was the first of two homers in Ryan's career and produced half of the six RBIs he got that year. On July 4 of that season, at Riverfront Stadium, Ryan recorded his 3,000th career strikeout, the victim being César Gerónimo of the Cincinnati Reds (Gerónimo had also been Bob Gibson's 3,000th strikeout victim, in 1974). Ryan got his third taste of postseason play in 1980, but the Astros were stopped one game short of the World Series.

In the 1980 NLCS versus the Philadelphia Phillies, Ryan pitched well in Game 2, leaving the game tied 2–2 in the seventh (having contributed to both Astros runs with a run scored following a walk, and a sacrifice bunt leading to a run) but again got a no-decision in a game that went extra innings. In the fifth and final game of the series, Ryan and the Astros held a 5–2 lead entering the 8th inning. But Ryan allowed three consecutive singles before walking in the third run. The Houston bullpen allowed the Phillies to take a 7–5 lead, and only a game-tying Astro rally permitted Ryan to escape the loss.

On September 26, 1981, Ryan threw his fifth no-hitter, breaking Koufax's mark while becoming the third pitcher to throw a no-hitter in each league. That season, his 1.69 ERA won the National League ERA title.

Facing the Los Angeles Dodgers in the 1981 NLDS, Ryan threw a complete game 2-hitter in the opener, outlasting the Dodgers' rookie sensation Fernando Valenzuela. It was Ryan's second and last career postseason win. In the fifth and final game of the series, Ryan left trailing 3–0 and took the loss.

By the end of the 1982 season, both Ryan and Steve Carlton were approaching Walter Johnson's all-time strikeout record, sometimes passing one another's career totals in successive starts. On April 27, 1983, Ryan won the race with his 3,509th whiff, against Brad Mills of the Montreal Expos. (Carlton reached the same mark two weeks after Ryan, and Gaylord Perry did so later that season.) On July 11, 1985, Ryan struck out Danny Heep for his 4,000th career strikeout.

In 1986, Ryan's Astros faced the New York Mets in the National League Championship Series. Ryan had a shaky start in Game 2, taking the loss. He returned in Game 5, throwing 9 innings of 2-hit, 1-run, 12-strikeout ball, but one of those hits was a Darryl Strawberry home run which tied the game at 1, as Dwight Gooden matched Ryan pitch for pitch. Ryan got a no-decision as his Astros lost in 12 innings.

In 1987, Ryan led the major leagues in both ERA (2.76) and strikeouts (270) at the age of 40, but finished 8–16 as the result of extremely poor run support; the Astros scored a total of 27 runs in his 16 losses–an average of 1.69 runs per game. Despite his .333 winning percentage, Ryan tied for 5th place in the 1987 Cy Young voting. Ryan hit his second and final career home run in a 12–3 win on May 1, 1987, against the Atlanta Braves.

In nine seasons as a pitcher with the Astros (his longest tenure with any team), Ryan compiled a 106–94 record in 282 starts, a 3.13 ERA, 1.20 WHIP, with 796 walks and 1,866 strikeouts in 1,854 innings.

Texas Rangers (1989–1993)

Ryan left Houston after a contract dispute following the 1988 season and signed with the Texas Rangers at age 42. He became the first player to play for all four MLB original expansion teams: the Mets, Angels, Houston Colt .45s/ Astros and Washington Senators/Texas Rangers. (Ryan was joined in this category by Darren Oliver, who made his major league debut as Ryan's teammate in September 1993. Oliver's father Bob had also been a teammate of Ryan's, with the Angels from 1972 to 1974.) In 1989, he went 16–10 and led the league with 301 strikeouts. Against the Oakland Athletics on August 22, Ryan struck out Rickey Henderson to become the only pitcher to record 5,000 career strikeouts. Following the game, Henderson was quoted as saying, "If he ain't struck you out, then you ain't nobody." His 4,999th and 5,001st strikeouts were against the same man, Athletics catcher Ron Hassey. Two years later, at 44, Ryan finished fifth in the league in ERA (2.91) and third in strikeouts (203).

In 1990, Ryan threw his sixth no-hitter on June 11 against the Athletics, and earned his 300th win on July 31 against the Milwaukee Brewers. On May 1, 1991, at age 44, Ryan extended his record by throwing the seventh no-hitter of his career, striking out Roberto Alomar of the Toronto Blue Jays for the final out. On August 6, 1992, Ryan had the only ejection of his career when he was ejected after engaging in a shouting match with Oakland Athletics outfielder Willie Wilson with two outs in the eighth inning.

Before the 1993 season began, Ryan announced that he would retire as a player at the end of that season. On August 4, just before the end, Ryan had yet another high-profile moment—this time an on-the-mound fight. After Ryan hit Robin Ventura of the Chicago White Sox with a pitch, Ventura charged the mound in order to fight Ryan, who was 20 years his senior. Ryan secured the 26-year-old Ventura in a headlock with his left arm, while pummeling Ventura's head with his right fist six times before catcher Iván Rodríguez was able to pull Ventura away from Ryan. Ryan stated afterwards it was the same maneuver he used on steers he had to brand on his Texas ranch. Videos of the incident were played that evening throughout the country. While Ventura was ejected, Ryan–who had barely moved from his spot on the mound in the fracas–was allowed to remain in the game. White Sox manager Gene Lamont vehemently argued this, leading to his own ejection. Ryan pitched a hitless ball game the rest of the way. He had been determined to be more aggressive after coming out on the wrong side of an altercation with Dave Winfield in 1980.

Ryan's arm gave out in Seattle on September 22, 1993, when he tore a ligament. The injury ended his career two starts earlier than planned, at age 46. Ryan briefly attempted to pitch past the injury, and he threw one additional pitch after tearing his ligament. Ryan's last start was his career-worst; he allowed a single, four walks, and a grand slam in the top of the first without recording an out. It was his record-setting 10th grand slam given up of his career. (Ryan left trailing 5–0, and the fourth walk was completed by a reliever after Ryan's injury, but credited to Ryan.) Greg Myers of the California Angels was the last strikeout victim of Nolan Ryan's career, on September 17, 1993.

Ryan finished his career having played in a major league record 27 seasons. He was the final active player from the 1960s to retire from Major League Baseball, outlasting Carlton Fisk (the final active position player) by three months.

In five seasons with the Rangers, Ryan had a 51–39 record, a 3.43 ERA, 1.12 WHIP, with 353 walks and 939 strikeouts in 840 innings over 129 starts.

Career statistics

Seven no-hitters
Ryan threw a record seven no-hitters during his major league career, three more than any other pitcher. The no-hitters spanned three decades of pitching. In those seven games, Ryan accumulated a total of 94 strikeouts and 26 walks; a ratio of 3.6 strikeouts per walk (his career K:BB was 2.0). Ryan struck out 17 in his no-hitter on July 15, 1973, versus Detroit and walked eight in his subsequent no-hitter against Minnesota, both respective highs for his no-hitters.

MLB records
Ryan holds 51 total MLB records, including:
 5,714 career strikeouts (next-most is Randy Johnson with 4,875)
 7 career no-hitters (next-most is Sandy Koufax with 4)
 Lowest career batting average allowed (minimum 1,500 innings pitched): .204
 12 career 1-hitters, tied with Bob Feller
 18 career 2-hitters
 31 career 3-hitters
 15 200-strikeout seasons
 6 300-strikeout seasons
 4 career 19+ strikeout games
 5 career 18+ strikeout games
 8 career 17+ strikeout games
 16 career 16+ strikeout games
 26 career 15+ strikeout games by a right-handed pitcher
 36 career 14+ strikeout games by a right-handed pitcher
 56 career 13+ strikeout games by a right-handed pitcher
 95 career 12+ strikeout games by a right-handed pitcher
 151 career 11+ strikeout games by a right-handed pitcher
 215 career 10+ strikeout games
 282 career 9+ strikeout games
 358 career 8+ strikeout games
 447 career 7+ strikeout games
 517 career 6+ strikeout games
 596 career 5+ strikeout games
 654 career 4+ strikeout games
 710 career 3+ strikeout games
 752 career 2+ strikeouts games
 3 19+ strikeout games, single season (1974)
 3 18+ strikeout games, single season (1974)
 3 17+ strikeout games, single season (1974)
 3 16+ strikeout games by a right-handed pitcher, single season (1972, 1974)
 6 15+ strikeout games, single season (1974 - tied with Pedro Martinez)
 15 12+ strikeout games, single season (1973)
 18 11+ strikeout games by a right-handed pitcher, single season (1973)
 23 10+ strikeout games, single season (1973 - tied with Randy Johnson)
 26 9+ strikeout games, single season (1973)
 29 8+ strikeout games by a right-handed pitcher, single season (1973)
 32 7+ strikeout games by a right-handed pitcher, single season (1973)
 36 6+ strikeout games, single season (1974 - tied with Sandy Koufax)
 6.55 hits per nine innings pitched, career, minimum 1,000 innings (next-fewest is Sandy Koufax at 6.79)
 5.26 single-season hits per nine innings (1972)
 26 seasons with at least one win

Later activity
Nolan Ryan's post-retirement business interests include principal owner of Ryan Sanders Sports and Entertainment, which is the ownership group for the Round Rock Express, the Triple-A Affiliate of the Texas Rangers, among other businesses.

Ryan threw out the ceremonial first pitch before Game 3 of the 2005 World Series between the Astros and the White Sox, the first World Series game played in Texas. That game went 14 innings, equaling the longest in innings in World Series history (at 5:41, it was the longest in time). ESPN wryly suggested the Astros might have needed to pull the 58-year-old Ryan out of retirement if the game had gone much longer.

Ryan has co-written six books: autobiographies Miracle Man (with Jerry Jenkins, 1992), Throwing Heat (with Harvey Frommer, 1988) and The Road to Cooperstown (with Mickey Herskowitz and T.R. Sullivan, 1999); Kings of the Hill (with Mickey Herskowitz, 1992), about contemporary pitchers; and instructional books Pitching and Hitting (with Joe Torre and Joel Cohen, 1977), and Nolan Ryan's Pitcher's Bible (with Tom House, 1991).

In addition to his baseball activities, Ryan was majority owner and chairman of Express Bank of Alvin but sold his interest in 2005. He also owned a restaurant in Three Rivers, Texas. He served on the Texas Parks and Wildlife Commission from 1995 to 2001. He appeared as a TV spokesman for Advil for several years, promoting the pain medication he recommended for his own arm. He also has appeared in various television commercials shown in the Texas market.

After retiring from baseball, Ryan teamed up with the federal government to promote physical fitness. His likeness was used in the "Nolan Ryan Fitness Guide", published by The President's Council on Physical Fitness and Sports in 1994. Ryan suffered a heart attack on April 25, 2000, and had to receive a double coronary bypass.

Texas Rangers president and CEO (2008–2013)

In February 2008, the Rangers hired Ryan as team president. After the 2009 season, Ryan and Chuck Greenberg submitted a bid to purchase the Rangers from owner Tom Hicks. At midnight on August 5, 2010, the Ryan/Greenberg group, Rangers Baseball Express, was announced as the winners of the final auction to purchase the Rangers, after final approval from Major League Baseball. The final cash bid to purchase the franchise was $385 million. The opposing high bidder was Dallas Mavericks owner Mark Cuban. Greenberg became managing general partner and CEO, while Ryan remained as team president.

Greenberg left the group in March 2011, reportedly due to a philosophical clash with Ryan. Ryan was immediately named as CEO while keeping the title of president. Although Texas oil magnates Ray Davis and Bob Simpson served as co-chairmen and held larger stakes, Ryan became the undisputed head of the franchise, with Davis and Simpson serving mostly as senior consultants.

Ryan was named the Dallas–Fort Worth's 2012 CEO of the Year by Southern Methodist University's Cox School of Business.

During the baseball owners' meetings in Scottsdale, Arizona, on March 1, 2013, the Rangers announced that general manager Jon Daniels would add president of baseball operations to his title. Rick George was promoted to president of business operations. Ryan's title was changed simply to CEO, but he remained operating head of the franchise; both Daniels and George reported to him. On October 17, 2013, Ryan announced that he was stepping down as Rangers CEO effective October 31, 2013.

Houston Astros special assistant (2014–2019)
On February 11, 2014, Ryan accepted a position as an executive adviser for the Houston Astros under owner Jim Crane. Ryan's son, Reid Ryan, was hired the previous year as president of business operations for the Astros. The Astros won the 2017 World Series and won the 2019 American League pennant. Reid Ryan was demoted by the Astros after the 2019 World Series, and shortly thereafter Nolan Ryan sent a text message to a reporter indicating that he would not return to the Astros front office for the 2020 season.

Legacy

Ryan played in more seasons (27) than any other player in modern (since 1900) major league history (All-time he is tied with Cap Anson for #1). Ryan ranks first all-time in strikeouts (5,714), fewest hits allowed per nine innings (6.56), and no-hitters (7). He is also fifth in innings pitched (5,386), second in games started (773), seventh in shutouts (61), is tied for 14th in wins (324), and is third in losses (292). Opposing hitters hit only .204 against Ryan during his career, although they had a .309 on-base percentage against him. He also limited hitters to a .298 slugging percentage. Ryan had 15 or more strikeouts in a game 26 times, second only to Randy Johnson, who had 28. Ryan's lengthy career spanned generations as he struck out seven pairs of fathers and sons (for example, Bobby Bonds and Barry Bonds), another major league record. Ryan also played during the administrations of seven U.S. Presidents—Lyndon B. Johnson, Richard M. Nixon, Gerald Ford, Jimmy Carter, Ronald Reagan, George H. W. Bush, and Bill Clinton—equaling a 20th-century record that had been set by Jim Kaat.

Ryan also ranks high on the list for four "negative" records; he ranks first all-time in walks allowed (2,795), first in wild pitches (277), third in losses (292 – most in the post-1920 live-ball era), and ninth in hit batters (158). Ryan was the first pitcher in MLB history to give up ten grand slam home runs, including one to Dann Howitt, the next-to-last batter Ryan faced in his career; he has since been surpassed.

Bill James focuses on this dichotomy between Ryan's positive and negative statistics. While ranking him as the 24th best pitcher of all time, he notes, "Ryan has been retired almost ten years [in 2001], in another ten perhaps we will begin to get a little bit of perspective on him. Ryan's log of spectacular accomplishments is as thick as Bill Clinton's little black book; his list of flaws and failures is lengthy but dry, and will never make for good reading."

Other writers have delved more into the specifics of James' general concerns. ESPN writer Rob Neyer stated in a 2003 column that while Ryan was among the 20 best pitchers since World War II, he "often had trouble throwing strikes, [and] he wasn't any good at fielding his position". In another column, Neyer, while stating that Ryan belonged in the Hall of Fame, pointed to Ryan's record-breaking walks total and noted that his .309 on-base percentage against "wasn't even close to being in the top 100".

Ryan and Frank Robinson are the only two major league players to have their number retired by three teams on which they played. The California Angels retired the number 30 on June 16, 1992; the Texas Rangers retired his number 34 on September 15, 1996; and the Houston Astros retired number 34 on September 29, 1996. His number was the first retired by the Rangers.

Ryan was elected to the Baseball Hall of Fame in 1999 in his first year of eligibility with 98.79% of the vote (491 out of 497 possible), six votes short of a unanimous election and the fifth-highest percentage in history, behind Mariano Rivera (100%, 425 out of 425 possible), Derek Jeter (99.75%, 396 out of 397 possible), Ken Griffey Jr. (99.32%, 437 out of 440 possible), and Tom Seaver (98.84%, 425 out of 430 possible). He chose to wear a Rangers cap for his HOF plaque to reflect his Texas heritage, as well as the fact that his 300th win, 5000th strikeout, and last two no-hitters came as a Ranger. He was the first Hall of Famer inducted as a Ranger. However, the Hall of Fame recognizes the Los Angeles Angels as his primary team. That year, he ranked 41st on The Sporting News list of the 100 Greatest Baseball Players and was elected to the Major League Baseball All-Century Team. He was inducted into the Texas Rangers Hall of Fame in 2003, and named the Rangers', and Astros' Hometown Hero in 2006—the only player to be so named by two franchises. In 2011, he was inducted into the Irish American Baseball Hall of Fame.

In 1992, the United States Mint produced a $1 commemorative coin honoring Olympic baseball depicting a pitcher in a USA Baseball uniform, but in a pose nearly identical to Ryan's photo on his 1991 Fleer baseball card. The numismatic community subsequently referred to the coin as the "Nolan Ryan dollar."

In 1995 the Texas State Legislature declared State Highway 288, which passes near Alvin, as the Nolan Ryan Expressway.

The Alvin Independent School District opened Nolan Ryan Junior High School, located at 11500 Shadow Creek Parkway (FM 2234) in Pearland, Texas, just a few hundred yards away from the Nolan Ryan Expressway.

The Nolan Ryan Foundation is a Texas nonprofit organization that supports youth, education, and community development and is headquartered in Round Rock, Texas.

The Texas Trail of Fame inducted Ryan in 2009.

The Texas Cowboy Hall of Fame inducted Ryan in 2010.

Personal life 
Ryan married his high school sweetheart, the former Ruth Holdorff, on June 25, 1967. Nolan and Ruth attended Alvin High School together. Ruth was a high school state tennis champion. They have three children: Reid, Reese, and Wendy. Reid and Reese were both pitchers for the TCU Horned Frogs. Reid also pitched briefly in the minor leagues. On May 17, 2013, Reid was announced as president of the Houston Astros.

Nolan frequently pitched in the off-seasons, with Ruth often donning catching gear and serving as his catcher. Ruth Ryan also coached their sons' little league teams for a few summers.

Nolan Ryan resides in the Cimarron Hills community in Georgetown, Texas.

Political activity
Ryan wrote in his 1992 autobiography "Miracle Man" that he voted for Jimmy Carter over Gerald R. Ford Jr. in 1976, but since then has generally identified as a Republican, though he does not automatically vote this way and looks at individual candidates, mentioning disgust at one particular election in which the two major parties were forcing a choice between "the racist or the criminal." He also crossed party lines in 2002 to headline a group of Republicans and Independents supporting a Democratic candidate for Lieutenant Governor of Texas. He has maintained a decades-long friendship with the Bush family, partially due to George W. Bush being a part-owner of the Rangers while Ryan played there. However, in his 1992 book Ryan expressed some criticisms of the elder Bush's (George H.W. Bush) management of domestic issues and said he wasn't "locked in" to voting for Bush that fall. In 1996 Ryan campaigned on behalf of Ron Paul in the election for Texas's 14th congressional district; his hometown of Alvin was located in the district.

On April 7, 2011, Todd Staples announced that Nolan Ryan would be his statewide chairman for his exploratory committee for lieutenant governor. Ryan is quoted as saying, "Todd Staples is the top prospect for the Texas Republican Party in 2014." Staples, however, lost that race to current Lieutenant Governor Dan Patrick of Houston.

See also

 300 win club
 DHL Hometown Heroes
 Houston Astros award winners and league leaders • No-hitters • Team records
 List of Major League Baseball annual ERA leaders
 List of Major League Baseball career wins leaders
 List of Major League Baseball no-hitters
 List of Major League Baseball annual strikeout leaders
 List of Major League Baseball players who played in four decades
 List of Major League Baseball single-game strikeout leaders
 List of Texas Rangers Opening Day starting pitchers
 List of Major League Baseball career hit batsmen leaders
 List of Major League Baseball career strikeout leaders
 List of Major League Baseball career bases on balls allowed leaders
 Nolan Ryan's Baseball

References

General references

External links

Nolan Ryan at SABR (Baseball BioProject)
Nolan Ryan at Baseball Almanac
Nolan Ryan at Baseball Library
Nolan Ryan at Astros Daily
Nolan Ryan at Ultimate Mets Database
The Nolan Ryan Foundation

1947 births
Living people
American League All-Stars
American League strikeout champions
California Angels players
Greenville Mets players
Houston Astros players
Jacksonville Suns players
Major League Baseball executives
Major League Baseball pitchers
Baseball players from Houston
Major League Baseball players with retired numbers
Major League Baseball team presidents
Marion Mets players
Minor league baseball executives
National Baseball Hall of Fame inductees
National League All-Stars
National League ERA champions
National League strikeout champions
New York Mets players
People from Alvin, Texas
People from Georgetown, Texas
Texas Rangers players
Texas Rangers executives
Texas Rangers owners
Texas Republicans
Williamsport Mets players
Winter Haven Mets players
Businesspeople from Texas
Ranchers from Texas
American bankers
American chief executives of professional sports organizations
American non-fiction writers
People from Refugio, Texas
Florida Instructional League Mets players